Jacob Micyllus, (6 April 1503 – 28 January 1558) was a German Renaissance humanist and teacher, who conducted the city's Latin school in Frankfurt and held a chair at the University of Heidelberg, during times of great cultural stress in Germany.

Micyllus was born Jakob Moltzer in Strasbourg.  From 1518 to 1522 he studied in Erfurt, then at the end of 1522 went to Philipp Melanchthon in Wittenberg. From 1524, aged only twenty-one, he directed the city Latin school at Frankfurt, on Melanchthon's recommendation. But he was not at ease with the radical Reformation in Frankfurt from 1526 and found a place as professor in Heidelberg, January 1533.  He died in Heidelberg.

Selected works 

 Varia epigrammata graeca & latina & alia carmina graca, Basel 1538
 Sylva variorum carminum
 Commentataria in Homerum, Basel 1541
 Annotationes in Joh. Bocatii genealogiam Deorum, Basel 1532
 Scholia ad Martialis obscuriores aliquot locos
 Ratio examinandorum versuum
 Calendarium
 Carmen elegiacum de ruina arcis Heidelbergensis, quae facta est 1537
 Annotationes in Ovidium, & in Lucanum
 Arithmetica logistica
 Euripidis vita, Basel 1558
 De Tragaedia & ejus partibus
 Traductio aliquot operum Luciani cum scholiis
 Annotationes in Euripidem, Basel 1562
 Urbis Francofurdi gratulatio ad Caronum, Leipzig 1530

Notes

References 

 Classen, Johannes. Jakob Micyllus, Rektor zu Frankfurt am Main 1524-1533 und 1537-1547, als Schulmann, Dichter und Gelehrter. Frankfurt am Main 1861
 Gerhard Dolinsky. Aus der Geschichtes des Frankfurter Gymnasiums, in: H.-J. Heydorn und K. Ringshausen: Jenseits von Resignation und Illusion - Festschrift zum 450jährigen Bestehen des Lessing-Gymnasiums. Frankfurt am Main 1971
 Johann Friedrich Hautz.  Jacobus Micyllus Argentoratensis, philologus et poeta, Heidelbergae et Repertinae Universitatis olim decus: commentatio historico-literaria. Heidelbergae: J.C.B. Mohr, 1842. 
 Johann Classen. Nachträge zu der Biographie des Jakob Micyllus, Frankfurt/M 1861
 Georg Ellinger. Jakob Micyllus und Joachim Camerarius. In: Neue Jahrbuch für das klass. Altertum, Geschichte und deutsche Literatur und für Pädagogik Jahrgang 24 (1909), pp. 1 50-173. - Ellinger 2, pp. 28–44
 Otto Clemen. Zu Jakob Micyllus In: Neue Heidelberger Jahrbuch N. F. (1941): 1-11
 Arthur Henkel. "In Mortem Simii Heidelbergensis". Zu einem Epikediom des Jakob Micyllus In: Festschrift Leonard Forster. Baden-Baden 1982, S. 264-280
 Hermann Wiegand. Hodoeporica. Baden-Baden 1984
 
 
 Walther Killy, ed. Literaturlexikon: Autoren und Werke deutscher Sprache (15 Bände). Gütersloh, München: Bertelsmann-Lexikon-Verl., 1988-1991 (CD-ROM: Berlin 1998)

External links 
 
 Johann Classen: Jakob Micyllus …, als Schulmann, Dichter u. Gelehrter. Frankfurt/M 1859
 Adam, Melchior: Vitae Germanorum philosophorum, qui seculo superiori, et quod excurrit, philosophicis ac humanioribus literis clari floruerunt.

1503 births
1558 deaths
16th-century German people
16th-century Latin-language writers
German Renaissance humanists
Academic staff of Heidelberg University
Alsatian-German people
Writers from Strasbourg